Orient Express was a monthly comic magazine published in Italy from 1982 to 1985.

History and profile 
Orient Express was founded in 1982 by Luigi Bernardi and intended to offer to its adult audience only high quality stories by Italian cartoonists. The first issue appeared in June 1982. The magazine was published monthly and featured unreleased stories of both well-known and unpublished characters. The magazine had its headquarters in Bologna until 1984 when it moved to Milan.

Series published by the magazine include Lo Sconosciuto and I Briganti by Magnus, Ken Parker by  Giancarlo Berardi and Ivo Milazzo, Martin Mystère by Alfredo Castelli and Giancarlo Alessandrini, Max Fridman by Vittorio Giardino, Johnny Focus by Attilio Micheluzzi, Stella Noris by Lorena Canossa and Roberto Baldazzini, Big Sleeping by Daniele Panebarco.

A collection of the magazine's best stories, Orient Express Collezione, was published between June 1985 and February 1986.

See also
 List of magazines published in Italy

Notes

External links

1982 establishments in Italy
1985 disestablishments in Italy
Comics magazines published in Italy
Defunct magazines published in Italy
Italian-language magazines
Magazines about comics
Magazines established in 1982
Magazines disestablished in 1985
Magazines published in Milan
Mass media in Bologna
Monthly magazines published in Italy